North Korea has a life expectancy of 72 years . While North Korea is classified as a low-income country, the structure of North Korea's causes of death (2013) is unlike that of other low-income countries. Instead, it is closer to the worldwide averages, with non-communicable diseases – such as cardiovascular disease – accounting for two-thirds of the total deaths.

A 2013 study stated that the largest obstacle for understanding the accurate health status of North Korea is the lack of the validity and reliability of its health data.

North Korea claims to provide universal health care with a national medical service and health insurance system. It claims that health services are offered for free. However, this claim has been contested by North Korean defectors, who claim that patients must in fact pay for health services, that the upper classes have access to a higher standard of healthcare than ordinary ones do, and that "how much money a patient has determines whether they live or die".

In 2001, North Korea spent 3% of its gross domestic product (GDP) on health care. Beginning in the 1950s, North Korea put great emphasis on healthcare, and between 1955–1986, the number of hospitals grew from 285 to 2,401, and the number of clinics – from 1,020 to 5,644. Special health care is available mainly in cities, where pharmacies are also common. Essential medicines are also well available. There are hospitals attached to factories and mines.

Most hospitals that exist today in the DPRK were built in the 1960s and 1970s. During the rule of Kim Il-sung, effective mandatory health checkups and immunization programs were initiated. The country could support a large corps of doctors due to their low salaries. The number of doctors remains high, though there is a shortage of nurses, meaning that doctors often have to perform routine procedures. The medical infrastructure is fairly effective in preventive medicine, but less so in terms of treating the more demanding conditions. Since 1979, more emphasis has been put on traditional Korean medicine, based on treatment with herbs and acupuncture.

North Korea's healthcare system suffered a steep decline since the 1990s because of natural disasters, economic problems, and food and energy shortages. By 2001, many hospitals and clinics in North Korea lacked essential medications, equipment, and running water due to the economic embargo and blockade by the United States and the international community. Electricity shortages remain the biggest problem. Even if sophisticated equipment were available, they are rendered useless if electricity is not available. Some facilities have generators available to meet demand during power outages.

Amnesty International, citing interviews with North Korean defectors, painted a grim picture of the North Korean healthcare system as one with "barely functioning hospitals." It described hospitals that operate without heat or electricity and doctors forced to work by flashlight or candlelight, doctors performing operations without anesthetics, patients forced to pay for firewood or use makeshift heaters by burning wood inside steel plates or a drum to keep their rooms warm, and shortages of medical equipment and medicines. Allegedly, a certain level of free medical treatment and preventive medicine was available to common citizens under Kim Il-sung, but the system's quality lapsed afterward. In 2010, the World Health Organization (WHO) criticized the Amnesty International report as outdated and factually inaccurate, describing the healthcare system as "the envy of the developing world" while acknowledging that "challenges remained, including poor infrastructure, a lack of equipment, malnutrition and a shortage of medicines." 

In 2020 the construction of a new central Pyongyang hospital started, the Pyongyang General Hospital, in front of the Monument to Party Founding. This is part of a programme of healthcare system improvement.

Health status

Life expectancy 
North Korea has a life expectancy of 72 years (as of 2020). The 2009 gender breakdown was 72.8 years life expectancy for females and 64.9 for males.

Source: UN World Population Prospects

Malnutrition 

During the 1990s, North Korea was ravaged by famine, causing the death of between 500,000 and 3,000,000 people. Food shortages are ongoing today, with factors such as bad weather, lack of fertiliser and a drop in international donation meaning that North Koreans do not have enough to eat. A study of North Koreans in 2008 found that three-quarters of respondents had reduced their food intake. Extreme poverty is also a factor in the hunger faced by North Korean people, with 27% of the population living at or below the absolute poverty line of less than US$1 a day.

These food shortages cause a number of malnutrition diseases. A 2009 UNICEF report found that North Korea was "one of 18 countries with the highest prevalence of stunting (moderate and severe) among children under 5 years old". A survey in 2017 found that less than 20% of North Korean children were stunted, a decrease from 32% in 2009.

Sanitation
A survey conducted in 2017 found that most people had access to a toilet, but that 93% of sanitation facilities were not connected to a sewage system. Rather, the human waste was used as fertiliser on fields, creating the potential health risk of spreading intestinal worms. The survey also found that a quarter of people had drunk contaminated drinking water.

Ophthalmology 
In 2006, Professor Gerd Auffarth of Heidelberg University Eye Hospital in Germany was permitted to visit the country. He is one of the few Western surgeons to have carried out eye surgery in North Korea. Before he arrived in Pyongyang, he was authorised to do just five surgeries but once he reached the University Hospital, he found that he could do seventeen: one perforating keratoplasty using donor tissue he had brought from Germany, three scleral-fixated secondary IOL implantations, and thirteen phacoemulsification procedures with IOL implants. All the procedures were conducted with topical anaesthesia which had been brought with him from Germany. He reported on his experiences in 2011 in a video entitled, Ophthalmology Behind the Iron Curtain: Cataract Surgery in North Korea, saying that the economic conditions have led to improvisations – especially because of the absence of consumable medical devices but he commented that once a visiting surgeon adapts to these unique surroundings, he found that teaching and clinical work could be very effective and satisfying for both surgeon and patient. As a consequence of this visit, in 2007 two young North Korean ophthalmic surgeons were permitted to visit Heidelberg and remain for six months, gaining extensive training in cataract surgery.

Another foreign ophthalmologist to visit North Korea to do surgery is Sanduk Ruit from Nepal. The Nepalese Tilganga Institute of Ophthalmology trains North Korean practitioners of ophthalmology.

Non-communicable diseases 

Non-communicable diseases (NCD) risk factors in North Korea include high rates of urbanisation, an ageing society, and high rates of smoking and alcohol consumption amongst men.

Cardiovascular disease as a single disease group is the largest cause of death in North Korea (2013). The three major causes of death in DPR Korea are ischaemic heart disease (13%), lower respiratory infections (11%) and cerebrovascular disease (7%).

Approximately 54.8% of all North Korean adult males smoke an average of fifteen cigarettes per day. Smoking prevalence is slightly higher amongst the urban worker population than the farming population. Amongst men, a high rate of excessive alcohol consumption has been reported, defined by the World Health Organisation as consumption of more than one bottle, per sitting, per person (26.3% of males).

The North Korea government has prioritized the prevention of NCDs in their National Strategic Plan for the Prevention and Control of Noncommunicable Diseases 2014-2020 and in 2005 ratified the WHO Framework Convention on Tobacco Control. As of 2022, it prioritized the prevention of diabetes.

Oral health 

In the past, North Koreans had few problems with dental health because their diet included little sugar. Since the 2000s, sugar has been introduced to diets in the form of confectionery and sweet snacks, especially in urban areas. Toothpaste is not regularly used.

Infectious diseases 
In 2003, infectious diseases, such as tuberculosis, malaria, and hepatitis B, were described as endemic to North Korea. An estimated 4.5% of North Koreans had hepatitis B in 2003.

In 2009, the flu pandemic in Asia affected the country.

In 2010, Amnesty International reported that North Korea was experiencing a tuberculosis epidemic, with 5% of the population infected with the disease. It attributed this to the "overall deterioration in health and nutrition status of the population as well as the rundown of the public health services".

In 2010, infections that cause pneumonia and diarrhoea were reported to be the leading causes of child death. In 2009, one-third of the school-age children in North Korea were assessed as having diseases caused by intestinal parasites.

Coronavirus outbreak

In 2020, North Korea was one of the first countries to close borders and take other measures due to the COVID-19 pandemic. On 2 April 2020, WHO's representative in North Korea reported that 709 people had been tested, with no confirmed cases, and 509 people were in quarantine.

HIV/AIDS

The DPRK government has always maintained that North Korea is completely free of AIDS. According to UNAIDS, less than 0.2% of North Korea's adult population were HIV-positive in 2006. In 2018, WHO's North Korean office said there were no reported HIV positive cases in the country.

A study in 2002 found both men and women were reasonably educated about HIV/AIDS. More than two-thirds knew about ways to avoid HIV/AIDS, and there were only few misconceptions about the disease. However, according to the UN Population Fund in 2001, even hospital staff occasionally had limited awareness. Travel across the border to China has been seen as a risk factor.

In 2011, North Korea spent $1,000,000 on HIV prevention, with similar figures for previous years. The same year, North Korea received $75,000 of international aid for combatting HIV/AIDS. There are testing points and clinics, but no antiretroviral therapy was reportedly available in 2006.

North Korea has punitive laws concerning certain populations at risk of HIV/AIDS. According to UNAIDS, such laws can stigmatise those affected by HIV/AIDS and hinder their treatment. North Korea criminalises the sex trade. Some drug-related crimes are a capital offense. On the other hand, drug users are not subjected to compulsory detention. Same-sex relations between consenting adult males is not illegal. North Korea deports visitors upon discovery of HIV-positive status.

See also

 Disability in North Korea

References

Works cited

Further reading

External links 

 WHO DPR Korea
 WHO DPR Korea profile
 WHO Country Cooperation Strategy Democratic People’s Republic of Korea